Ma'ayan Baruch (lit. Blessed Spring) is a kibbutz in northern Israel. Located near the intersection of the Israeli, Syrian and Lebanese border, it falls under the jurisdiction of Upper Galilee Regional Council. In 2014 it had a population of 720.

History

The kibbutz was founded in March 1947 on the land of Hamara, a moshav abandoned in 1920. The founders were members of other kvutzot who had met in Kfar Giladi; members of the HaTenua HaMeuhedet youth movement, members of Habonim who immigrated to British Mandate of Palestine as Ma'apilim (illegal immigrants of Aliyah Bet), and members of a garin of pioneering soldiers from South Africa who fought in the British Army during World War II.

After  the  1948 Palestine war, Ma'ayan Baruch took over part of the land belonging to the newly depopulated  Palestinian village of  Al-Sanbariyya.

Development projects
A new neighborhood in Ma'ayan Baruch was built to attract newcomers and bring money into the kibbutz coffers in the wake of the socio-economic problems that have affected many kibbutzim since the 1980s. The newcomers are from other kibbutzim and townships in the region, as well as other parts of the country.

Landmarks
A museum which holds a collection of prehistoric artifacts found in the Hula Valley, The Prehistoric Man Museum, is located on the kibbutz. The museum collection includes the skeleton of a prehistoric woman, approximately 50 years old, buried with her dog.

Notable people

 Menashe Kadishman (born 1932), sculptor and painter
 Rela Mazali (born 1948), Israeli peace activist and writer
 Amnon Shamosh, Israeli author and poet

See also
Notes from the Frontier, an account of life on the kibbutz in the mid-1960s by American author Hugh Nissenson.

References

Kibbutzim
Kibbutz Movement
Populated places established in 1947
1947 establishments in Mandatory Palestine
Populated places in Northern District (Israel)
South African-Jewish culture in Israel